Products Finishing is a monthly American trade magazine and web site focused on reporting on the use of organic and inorganic finishings and the technologies used to deliver them.

The Publisher is Todd Luciano, the Editor is Scott Francis. Editorial offices are located in Cincinnati, Ohio, USA. Products Finishing is published 12 times per year.

No-charge subscriptions are offered by qualification and are BPA-audited. As of June 2012, monthly circulation was 30,000+ subscribers.

History
The magazine was launched in 1936 by Donald Gardner of Gardner Publications, Inc., the publisher of Modern Machine Shop. In the introductory letter of the first issue, Gardner noted that due to rapid advancements in the engineering and production of metal products at that time, "the most important factor in the merchandising of metal products today is appearances". As stated in that issue, the magazine's staff would undertake the task of "searching out and disseminating the newest and best information available concerning metal finishing methods...including cleaning, polishing, buffing, plating, [and] lacquering".

References

External links
 Products Finishing | The Voice of the Finishing Industry

Monthly magazines published in the United States
Magazines established in 1936
Professional and trade magazines
Magazines published in Cincinnati